Hong Kong Football Club Stadium, also known as The Jungle, is a multi-purpose stadium located in Happy Valley, Hong Kong inside the oval of Happy Valley Racecourse. The main pitch is used for football and rugby (union) matches, and there is an adjoining hockey pitch. The playing surface has been synthetic since 2004.

The stadium, privately owned by the Hong Kong Football Club, holds 2,750 people and hosts the annual Hong Kong Tens tournament and the HKFC International Soccer Sevens tournament.

The original HKFC Stadium on Sports Road was the venue for the world-famous Hong Kong Sevens from its inception in 1976 until it outgrew its home and was moved to the Hong Kong Government Stadium (now the Hong Kong Stadium) in 1982. The original stadium was built in 1954 and demolished in 1995 and was located northeast, adjacent to the racecourse.

The pitch is also used for Junior football and Rugby teams. These teams train on the pitch on Saturdays and Sundays. Some teams also train on the Training Triangle, which is next to the main pitch.

See also
Leighton Road
Wong Nai Chung Road

References

External links
The Hong Kong Football Club

Football venues in Hong Kong
Rugby union stadiums in Hong Kong
Happy Valley, Hong Kong
Multi-purpose stadiums in Hong Kong